Tysdal is a surname. Notable people with the surname include:

Daniel Scott Tysdal (born 1978), Canadian poet and film director 
Håkon Tysdal (1947–2019), Norwegian writer